Vreeswijk may refer to:

Vreeswijk, former village and municipality in the Dutch province of Utrecht. The municipality merged with Jutphaas in 1971, and is now the southern half of the town of Nieuwegein
Cornelis Vreeswijk, Dutch-Swedish musician
Jack Vreeswijk, Swedish ballad singer, song lyricist and composer, son of Cornelis Vreeswijk